Mycetophylax is a genus of fungus-growing ants. The genus is characterized exclusively for the New World and is only found on coastal sandy beaches and shallow waters of Brazil.

Species
Mycetophylax conformis (Mayr, 1884)
Mycetophylax morschi (Emery, 1888)
Mycetophylax simplex (Emery, 1888)

References

Formicinae
Ant genera
Hymenoptera of South America
Fauna of Brazil